Asvestopetra is a small town in the Ptolemaida municipal unit, northern Kozani regional unit, Greece.  It is situated at an altitude of 635 meters above sea level.  The postal code is 50200, and the telephone code is +30 24630. The population was 739 at the 2011 census.

References

Populated places in Kozani (regional unit)